Hürlimann is a surname. Notable people with the surname include:

Ernst Hürlimann (born 1934), Swiss rower who competed in the 1960 Summer Olympics
Hans Hürlimann (1918–1994), Swiss politician and member of the Swiss Federal Council (1974–1982)
Janet Hürlimann, Swiss curler and coach
Manfred Hürlimann (born 1958), Swiss painter
Martin Hürlimann (1897–1984), Swiss photographer
Patrick Hürlimann (born 1963), Swiss curler and Olympic champion
Robert Hürlimann (born 1967), Swiss curler
Thomas Hürlimann (born 1950), Swiss playwright and novelist

See also
Hürlimann Brewery, former brewery in Zürich, Switzerland now owned by the brewery Feldschlösschen, which is owned by Carlsberg